Loudi is a prefecture-level city located in central Hunan province, China. In 2007, the city is named China's top ten livable cities by Chinese Cities Brand Value Report, which was released at 2007 Beijing Summit of China Cities Forum.

Geography 

The western parts of the city borders mountainous regions while the east parts is generally considered hilly with gently sloping topography.

Climate 
The climate is subtropical monsoon climate with humid weather and four distinct seasons.

History 
Before the Qin Dynasty (221BC-210BC) established a court, it belonged to the Chu, a vassal state to the Zhou dynasty.

Subdivisions 

Loudi administers one district, two county-level cities, and two counties. The information here presented uses data from 2010 national census.

Government

The current CPC Party Secretary of Loudi is Li Jianguo and the current Mayor is Yang Yiwen.

Notable Places

Ziquejie Terrace 
Located in Xinhua County, Ziquejie Terrace features, layers upon layers of terraces are mapped like waves on the hills upon the mountains.

Boyue Cave 
Boyue Cave scenic spot is a comprehensive park with karst as its main composition.  It has an underground route of 1800 meters covering 40 thousand square meters.

Economy 
The city is heavily dependent on industry. In 2011, Loudi's GDP reached RMB 83.79 billion ($12.9 billion). The biggest contributors come from the secondary industry where industry and construction amount to RMB 46.69 billion ($7.3billion USD), 55.75  of the city's GDP.

The city has rich natural resources. Coal mining, dressing, metallurgy, power production and supply, agricultural products processing, ceramics and construction materials are among the major industries of the city.

References

External links

Government site (Simplified Chinese)
China Tourist site (English)

 
Cities in Hunan
Prefecture-level divisions of Hunan